Brassenx was a barony of Upper Landes, in the southwest of France. Its historical capital was Arjuzanx. Its main town is now Morcenx. The etymology of Brassenx is a male Gallo-Roman name: Braccius, plus the pre-Celtic suffix: -incum. 

During the English occupation, Arjuzanx became the capital of the barony of Brassenx, where Edward III of England in 1338 published the laws and customs (fors et coutumes) of Brassenx.

Sources
The French Wikipedia (3 Feb 2009)

Landes (department)